Russia Township may refer to:

 Russia Township, Polk County, Minnesota
 New Russia Township, Lorain County, Ohio